Walking Past the Future is a 2017 Chinese drama film directed by Li Ruijun. It was screened in the Un Certain Regard section at the 2017 Cannes Film Festival.

Plot
Yang Yaoting's (Yang Zishan) family returns to their village in Gansu after both her parents are laid off from their jobs in Shenzhen but finds life has changed drastically from the one they left 25 years earlier. Yaoting returns to Shenzhen hoping to provide her family a home at the city takes part in high-risk medical tests at a hospital with tragic consequences.

Cast
 Yang Zishan as Yang Yaoting
 Yi Fang as Xinmin
 Li Qinqin
 Zhou Yunpeng
 Naren Hua

References

External links
 

2017 films
2017 drama films
Chinese drama films
2010s Mandarin-language films
Films directed by Li Ruijun